The men's large hill team ski jumping competition for the 2014 Winter Olympics in Sochi, Russia, was held on 17 February 2014 at RusSki Gorki Jumping Center in the Esto-Sadok village on the northern slope of Aibga Ridge in Krasnaya Polyana.

Results

References

Ski jumping at the 2014 Winter Olympics
Men's events at the 2014 Winter Olympics